MRW may refer to:

Businesses
 MRW Group Insurance, owner of Charles Woodhull House
 Mars RK, ICAO airline designator MRW
 Morrisons, London Stock Exchange ticker symbol MRW

Transportation
 Lolland Falster Airport (Maribo Airport), Denmark (IATA code)
 Meridian Water railway station (short station code)

Computing
 Minolta MRW, a raw image file format used in Minolta digital cameras between 2001 and 2004
 Konica Minolta MRW, a raw image file format used in Konica Minolta digital cameras between 2003 and 2006
 Mount Rainier (packet writing), an optical disc format
 Multifractal random walk, a multifractal system model

Publications
 Magic, Ritual, and Witchcraft, a peer-reviewed academic journal which focuses on magic scholarship
 Materials Recycling World, a former recycling and waste management magazine published by Ascential

Other uses
 Maranao language, ISO 639 code mrw
 Maximum Ramp Weight, the maximum weight authorised for manoeuvring an aircraft on the ground
 "My reaction when", commonly used in internet memes

See also
 
 
 MR (disambiguation)
 RW (disambiguation)